is a Japanese voice actress from Tokyo, Japan. She began her career in 2014, playing a role in the anime television series Nobunagun; later that year, she played her first main role as Rino Endō in the anime series Jinsei. She is known for her roles as Mai Sadohara in Märchen Mädchen, Izumi Asagi in Pastel Memories, and Ino Sakura in Dropout Idol Fruit Tart.

Biography
Nitta was born in Tokyo on July 1, 1997. She first became interested in anime during her sixth year of elementary school, when she began watching the series HeartCatch PreCure!. At the time, the series was the only anime that she was allowed to watch while studying for her examinations. After becoming a fan, she aspired to become part of the cast of a PreCure series within ten years.

Nitta began her voice acting training during her third year of junior high school, enrolling at the Japan Narration Acting Institute. She would later become affiliated with the voice acting agency Arts Vision. Her first role in an anime series was in the 2014 anime series Nobunagun. That same year, she would play her first main role as Rino Endō in the anime series Jinsei; she, together with fellow cast members Moe Toyota and Ayaka Suwa, performed the series's ending theme . In 2016, she played the role of Hime Wazumi in High School Fleet.

In 2018, Nitta played the roles of Mai Sadohara in Märchen Mädchen, Gabriel in Seven Mortal Sins, and Karin Domyoji in The Idolmaster Cinderella Girls. She also played Izumi Asagi in the mobile game Pastel Memories, later reprising the role for the game's 2019 anime series adaptation. She has also been cast as Ino Sakura, the protagonist of the anime series Ochikobore Fruit Tart.

Filmography

Anime

2014
Nobunagun
Jinsei as Rino Endō

2015
Uta no Prince-sama as Passerby
Aria the Scarlet Ammo AA as Konayuki Hitogi
Magical Girl Lyrical Nanoha ViVid as 1084
Lance N' Masques as Shaolon

2016
Monster Strike as Sexy Roller Player (episode 8)
Prince of Stride as Schoolgirl (episode 1)
Active Raid as Girl (episode 10)
Snow White with the Red Hair as Female officer
Undefeated Bahamut Chronicle as Schoolgirl
High School Fleet as Hime Wazumi
Prince of Stride: Alternative as Schoolgirl (episode 1)
Momokuri as Class student (episode 2)
Mob Psycho 100 as Female student (episode 2)
Magical Girl Raising Project as Natsumi (episode 7)

2017
Keijo as Sayuri Uotani (episode 1)

2018
Märchen Mädchen as Mai Sadohara
Uma Musume Pretty Derby as Matikanefukukitaru
Alice or Alice as Alpaca-san, Kabi Usagi

2019
Pastel Memories as Izumi Asagi
Why the Hell are You Here, Teacher!? as Satou Shio
Val × Love as Sue

2020
Dropout Idol Fruit Tart as Ino Sakura

2021
Seirei Gensouki: Spirit Chronicles as Sara

2023
The Ice Guy and His Cool Female Colleague as Yukimin

Anime film
2020
 High School Fleet: The Movie as Hime Wazumi

Games 
2018
 Girls' Frontline as LWMMG

2020
 Azur Lane as Prinz Heinrich

2023
 Disgaea 7 as Piririka
 Fuga: Melodies of Steel 2 as Wappa Charlott

References

External links
 Official agency profile 
 

1997 births
Living people
Arts Vision voice actors
Japanese video game actresses
Japanese voice actresses
Voice actresses from Tokyo